Nötsch im Gailtal Airport is a private use airport located near Nötsch im Gailtal, Carinthia, Austria.

See also
List of airports in Austria

References

External links 
 Airport record for Nötsch im Gailtal Airport at Landings.com

Airports in Austria
Carinthia (state)